Sanjeok is a type of jeok (skewered food) in Korean cuisine. It is usually made by placing seasoned slices of beef with vegetables on a skewer and grilling them. Unlike other jeok dishes, sanjeok is not dredged with flour or egg-washed before being grilled. Sanjeok may be used in jesa (ancestral rites) or eaten as banchan (a side dish).

Preparation 
Gogi-sanjeok is baked by cutting the tender meat into 1cm thick and 5~6cm long, seasoned with various spices, and stitched on a skewer on the back of the liver.

When making Songi-sanjeok, peel pine mushrooms and wash them thoroughly and cut them into appropriate sizes. Cut the beef into the same size as the pine mushroom and measure it in the sauce. These two are skewered and baked in a grill. Use a marinade without garlic, and bake it lightly to the extent that it will only cook the outside because the scent disappears if you bake it for a long time.

Tteok-sanjeok is grilled with beef and white rice cake seasoned with seasoning.

Varieties 
Sanjeok ingredients may vary, with beef as a staple.
 Dureup-sanjeok (angelica-tree shoot skewers)
 Eo-sanjeok (fish skewers) – often made with brown croaker
 Gogi-sanjeok (beef skewers)
 Honghap-sanjeok (mussel skewers)
 Ojingeo-sanjeok (squid skewers)
 Pa-sanjeok (scallion skewers)
 Songi-sanjeok (pine mushroom skewers)
 Sora-sanjeok (conch skewers)
 Tteok-sanjeok (rice cake skewers)
Jang-sanjeok and seop-sanjeok are not skewered dishes.
 Jang-sanjeok – made by grilling beef patties and simmering them in soy sauce
 Seop-sanjeok – made by grilling patties made with beef and tofu

Gallery

See also 
 Gui
 Jeon

References 

Korean beef dishes
Grilled skewers